The Cover Girl and the Cop, also known as Beauty & Denise, is a 1989 American comedy television film directed by Neal Israel, written by Michael Norell, and starring Julia Duffy, Dinah Manoff, and David Carradine. It aired on NBC on January 16, 1989.

Premise
In Washington, D.C., ditzy model-actress Jackie Flanders witnesses the murder of a powerful figure connected to the President. Claiming to the police that she has a stalker, she is protected by tough, streetwise cop Denise Danielovitch.

Cast
 Julia Duffy as Jackie Flanders
 Dinah Manoff as Denise Danielovitch
 David Carradine as Slade
 John Karlen as Lt. Wingo
 Arthur Taxier as Capt. Pashnick 
 Jonathan Frakes as Joshua Boyleston
 Blair Underwood as Horace Bouchet
 Whip Hubley as Lester Sweazy
 Robert Picardo as Denise's date

Production
Duffy at the time was best known for Newhart. Her role in the film was similar and she said, "It's simply a case of me playing different parts, but if people think they're the same (because of the strength of the Stephanie portrayal), there's nothing I can do about it. NBC has been pretty good about what they've offered me. It's really been a wide variety. Unfortunately, the ones for which I've been available don't mark that much of a departure, but that's just coincidence... I know that title sounds really fluffy, but (Manoff) plays a really terrific person who hides her light under a bushel, by dressing sloppily and talking tough. She thinks that men aren't attracted to her, and she just has no social life. I knew if that character were played by a really legitimate actress who was good at comedy as well as drama, the movie would have a real foundation."

References

External links
 
 
 Review at Los Angeles Times
 The Cover Girl at the Cop at Letterbox DVD

1989 television films
1989 films
1989 comedy films
1980s American films
1980s English-language films
1980s buddy comedy films
1980s buddy cop films
1980s female buddy films
American buddy comedy films
American buddy cop films
American comedy television films
American female buddy films
Films about murder
Films about witness protection
Films directed by Neal Israel
Films scored by Sylvester Levay
Films set in Washington, D.C.
NBC network original films